LinkWater, the trading name of the Queensland Bulk Water Transport Authority, a former statutory authority of the Government of Queensland was in operation between 2008 and 2012. During this period, the authority was responsible for the management, operation and maintenance of potable bulk water pipelines and related infrastructure throughout South East Queensland, in Australia.

Activities and functions
Linkwater was established on 2 May 2008 and began operations on 1 July 2008.  On the 31 December 2012 Linkwater ceased operations as it was merged into Seqwater.

In addition to bulk water pipelines, related infrastructure under LinkWater's control comprises 28 reservoirs/balance tanks, 22 pump stations and six water quality facilities. As the network controller, LinkWater moved on average  of water per day across the SEQ Water Grid, to where it is needed most.

See also

 Queensland Water Commission
 Seqwater
 Water security in Australia
 Water supply and sanitation in Australia

References

External links
 Seqwater
 SEQ Water Grid
 WaterSecure
 

Government agencies of Queensland
South East Queensland
Water companies of Queensland
2008 establishments in Australia
Government agencies established in 2008
2012 disestablishments in Australia
Government agencies disestablished in 2012